James Jamon Meredith (born May 11, 1986) is a former American football offensive tackle. He was drafted by the Green Bay Packers in the fifth round of the 2009 NFL Draft. He played college football at South Carolina.

Meredith has played for the Buffalo Bills, Detroit Lions, New York Giants, Pittsburgh Steelers, Tampa Bay Buccaneers, Green Bay Packers, and Cincinnati Bengals.

Early years
Meredith attended Hillcrest High School in Simpsonville, South Carolina, where he was a two-way lineman. At ,  he projected as defensive end in college.

Regarded as only a two-star recruit Rivals.com, Meredith was not ranked among the nation's top defensive end prospects. He committed early to South Carolina, choosing the Gamecocks over Clemson.

College career
At South Carolina, Meredith switched from the defensive to the offensive line. In his initial year, he saw action in one game, getting in for three plays against Vanderbilt, but was later granted a redshirt year. In his redshirt freshman year, he earned four starts at right tackle, including the 2005 Independence Bowl against Missouri.

As a sophomore, Meredith started all 13 games on the Gamecocks offensive line, the first seven games at right tackle, and then moved to left tackle for the final six contests. He garnered SEC offensive lineman of the week honors after helping the Gamecocks to a 31-28 victory over arch-rival Clemson, in which he anchored an offensive line that held Gaines Adams and the athletic Clemson defensive front without a quarterback sack.

In 2007, he started all 12 games at left tackle. In his senior year, he had to sit out the first two games due to an NCAA eligibility ruling stemming from his freshman season. He later sat out a couple games with an ankle injury, and played most of the season at left guard.

Professional career

2009 NFL Draft
Meredith was considered as one of the better offensive tackles in the 2009 NFL Draft, but was projected to play guard or right tackle in the NFL because he lacked the top athleticism for left tackle.

Green Bay Packers
Meredith was selected in the fifth round, No. 162 overall, by the Green Bay Packers.

Meredith was released on September 5, 2009 and re-signed to the team's practice squad.

Buffalo Bills
Meredith was signed off the Green Bay Packers' practice squad by the Buffalo Bills on September 22, 2009 after offensive tackle Brad Butler suffered a season-ending injury.

Meredith was waived on October 4, 2010.

Detroit Lions
Meredith was claimed by the Detroit Lions on October 5, 2010. He was waived on October 17.

New York Giants
On October 18, 2010, the New York Giants claimed Meredith off waivers. He was waived on September 3, 2011.

Pittsburgh Steelers
Meredith signed with the Pittsburgh Steelers on September 13, 2011.

Tampa Bay Buccaneers
Meredith signed with the Tampa Bay Buccaneers on March 21, 2012.

He became the starting right guard on October 14, 2012. He replaced backup guard Ted Larsen, who had been starting for right guard Davin Joseph after he had been lost for the season due to injury. The Buccaneers released Meredith on August 29, 2014.

Indianapolis Colts
Meredith signed with the Indianapolis Colts on September 3, 2014. He was released on November 4, 2014.

Second stint with the Green Bay Packers
Meredith re-signed with the Green Bay Packers on November 8, 2014. He was released on November 15, 2014.

Cincinnati Bengals
Meredith signed with the Cincinnati Bengals on November 25, 2014. On December 2, 2014, he was waived.

Tennessee Titans
Meredith was signed to the Titans' roster on December 9, 2014.

References

External links
 South Carolina Gamecocks bio 

1986 births
Living people
People from Simpsonville, South Carolina
Players of American football from South Carolina
American football offensive tackles
American football offensive guards
South Carolina Gamecocks football players
Green Bay Packers players
Buffalo Bills players
Detroit Lions players
New York Giants players
Pittsburgh Steelers players
Tampa Bay Buccaneers players
Indianapolis Colts players
Cincinnati Bengals players
Tennessee Titans players